Pioneer Kitchenware, formerly known as the Ghana Pioneer Aluminium Factory, is a kitchenware retailer in Ghana. It was listed on the stock index of the Ghana Stock Exchange, the GSE All-Share Index, until 14 January 2019.

References

External links
Official Website
Pioneer Kitchenware at Alacrastore

Kitchenware brands
Ghanaian brands
Retail companies of Ghana
Retail companies established in 1957
1957 establishments in Ghana
Companies listed on the Ghana Stock Exchange
Tema